Offinso North is one of the constituencies represented in the Parliament of Ghana. It elects one Member of Parliament (MP) by the first past the post system of election.

Augustine Collins Ntim is the member of parliament for the constituency. He was elected on the ticket of the New Patriotic Party (NPP) won a majority of 3,014 votes to become the MP. He succeeded Dr. Kofi Konadu Apraku had represented the constituency in the 4th Republic parliament.

See also
List of Ghana Parliament constituencies

References 

Parliamentary constituencies in the Ashanti Region